The Country Side of Pat Boone is a country album by Pat Boone, released in 1976 on Motown's subsidiary MC Records.

It was the second and final of two albums Boone recorded for Motown's Nashville division in the second half of the 1970s.

Track listing

References 

1976 albums
Pat Boone albums
Motown albums
Albums produced by Ray Ruff
Country albums by American artists